Mount Pleasant has referred to several communities in the Commonwealth of Kentucky:

 Harlan in Harlan County, also known as Mount Pleasant from 1819–1912
 Boone Furnace in Carter County, known as Mount Pleasant from 1857–1860
 Mount Pleasant in Trimble County, whose post office operated from 1892–1907